Robert Klümpen (born 1973 in Issum, North Rhine-Westphalia) is a German painter.

In 2001, he graduated from Academy of Arts, Düsseldorf, where he studied with A. R. Penck and Dieter Krieg.

He lives and works in Düsseldorf.

Awards
1999 	Fellowship Kunstakademie Düsseldorf
2004 	Fellowship in Venice (Studienstiftung des Deutschen Volkes)
2005 	Villa Romana Fellow

Exhibitions

2009–10
Galerie Wolfgang Gmyrek, Düsseldorf, "Ich bring Frische"

2009
Galerie Seippel, Köln, "Schauraum Dachs u. Fuchs"

2008
Galerie Peter Tedden, Düsseldorf, "Hier zu? Dann geh‘ an‘ Kiosk!"

2007
Galerie Seippel, Köln
Galerie Martina Detterer, Frankfurt/M., Bright Malkasten, Düsseldorf, Dicke Freunde (with Peter Josef Abels)

2006
Villa de Bank, Enschede, Niederlande, lekker
Galerie Seippel, Köln, Himmel un Ähd (Katalog)
Galerie Peter Tedden, Düsseldorf, Klümpen und Lander. "Und gut is". (with Alexander Lauer)

2005
"Einkehr", Emsdetterner Kunstverein
"Zur Kasse, bitte", Ludwig Forum für Internationale Kunst, Aachen
"gute Nacht", Kunstverein Göppingen

2004
"Villa Romana-Preisträger", Von der Heydt Museum Wuppertal
"Reserviert", Galerie Triebold, Riehen/Switzerland
"Souvenir", Galerie Martina Detterer, Frankfurt am Main
"Diensteingang", Centro Tedesco di Studi Veneziani, Venedig

2003
"Helles und Dunkles", with Ulrich Meister, Galerie der Deutschen Gesellschaft für christliche Kunst e.V., Munich
"Herbst", Galerie Peter Tedden, Düsseldorf
"Lenz", Galleria Mudimadue, Milano

2002
FFFZ Kunstforum, Düsseldorf
Galerie Timm Gierig, Frankfurt
Galerie Alfred Knecht, Karlsruhe
"Gloria", Kunstraum Fuhrwerkswaage, Cologne
"Tor", Kunstsommer Oberhausen 2002, Galerie Peter Tedden, Düsseldorf/Oberhausen
"Vielen Dank, auf Wiedersehen", Galerie Lethert, Bad Münstereifel
"Separée", Galerie Seippel, Cologne
"Liveshow", La Lune en Parachute (Kunstverein), Epinal/France
Galerie Jürgen Kalthoff, Essen
"Pascha", Kunstverein Grafschaft Bentheim, Neuenhaus

2001
"BILK", Galerie Triebold, Rheinfelden/Switzerland
"Acryl auf Nessel", art-agents-gallery, Hamburg
"Paper Jam – Junge Kunst im Fodus", Bielefelder Kunstverein
"Malerei & Anstrich", mit Arno Bojak, Galerie Tedden, Düsseldorf
"ACCROCHAGE", Galerie Schneiderei, Cologne
Art Cologne, Galerie Triebold, Rheinfelden/Switzerland

2000
"Von Chaos und Ordnung der Seele II", Mainz, Nürnberg
"Garage", Kunstverein Oberhausen
Galerie Schneiderei, Cologne
"Zwinger", BBK Düsseldorf

1999
Kunstverein Xanten e.V., with Sven Kroner
"Höhe x Breite", Bayerische Landesbank, Luxembourg
Museum Karlsruhe, with Frank Jebe
Schauspielhaus Düsseldorf
"Madau", Galerie Peter Tedden, Düsseldorf

1998
"Düsseldorfer Akzente", Nordstern Versicherungs-AG, Cologne

References

External links
Robert Klümpen 'Ich bring Frische' , Artnet

1973 births
Living people
People from Kleve (district)
20th-century German painters
20th-century German male artists
German male painters
21st-century German painters
21st-century German male artists